Zamia skinneri is a species of plant in the family Zamiaceae. It is endemic to the coastal area of mainland Bocas del Toro Province, Panama. Its common name is cebolla roja.

This has long been considered to be a variable plant that was likely a species complex, with individuals actually belonging to several undescribed species. In 2008 some populations were studied, characterized as new species, and renamed Zamia hamannii, Zamia imperialis, and Zamia nesophila.

This separation reduced the size of the population of actual Z. skinneri to fewer than 500.

References

skinneri
Endangered plants
Endemic flora of Panama
Taxonomy articles created by Polbot